The 1946 Tulsa Golden Hurricane football team was an American football team that represented the University of Tulsa in the Missouri Valley Conference (MVC) during the 1946 college football season. In their first year under head coach Buddy Brothers, the Golden Hurricane compiled a 9–1 record (3–0 against MVC opponents), won the MVC championship, and was ranked No. 17 in the final AP Poll. The team won victories over Texas Tech (21–6), Kansas (56–0), Cincinnati (20–0), Oklahoma State (20–18), Baylor (17–0), and No. 10-ranked Arkansas (14–13), and lost only to Detroit (14–20).

°==Schedule==

1947 NFL Draft

The 1947 NFL Draft was held on December 16, 1946. The following Golden Hurricane players were selected.

References

Tulsa
Tulsa Golden Hurricane football seasons
Missouri Valley Conference football champion seasons
Tulsa Golden Hurricane football